The men's 400 metres event at the 2013 European Athletics Indoor Championships was held on March 1, 2013 at 12:02 (round 1), March 2, 17:45 (semi-final) and March 3, 12:00 (final) local time.

Records

Results

Round 1
Qualification: First 2 (Q) or and the 4 fastest athletes (q) advanced to the final.

Semi-final 
Qualification: First 3 (Q) advanced to the final.

Final 
The final was held at 12:00.

References

400 metres at the European Athletics Indoor Championships
2013 European Athletics Indoor Championships